Angus Creek may refer to:

Angus Creek (New South Wales), a creek in New South Wales, Australia
Angus Creek (Nipissing District), a creek in Ontario, Canada
Angus Creek (Sudbury District), a creek in Ontario, Canada